Nicolás Andrés Gianni (born 27 September 1982 in Villa Lugano) is an Argentine footballer.

Club career
Gianni started his career at Argentinos Juniors aged 18 in 2000, making his professional debut in a 1–0 loss against Rosario Central. In 2002, the club lost the category and was relegated to the Primera B Nacional (Second Division), however Argentinos re-gained their place in Primera División in 2004, but in the same season he was loaned to Defensores de Belgrano, once playing in Second Division.

In 2005, he returned to Argentinos and in the next season, Gianni won experience in Primera División, scoring his first goal for this tournament against Banfield in the penultimate week of the Torneo de Clausura 2006. After of his goal against Banfield, he again to score in the last week of the tournament, scoring the only goal of the match at 53rd minute against Colón de Santa Fe. Despite of his good performance in the Clausura, he only played two matches in the Torneo Apertura. During the season 2007 and the Clausura 2008, he was regular in the team, playing the majority of the games as a substitute and being titular in few occasions.

On 26 June 2008, Gianni was loaned to the Chilean team Universidad Católica, he arrived to the precordilleran club with the mission of replace to his countrymen Darío Bottinelli. He also was recommended to the coach Fernando Carvallo by the former footballer Jorge Quinteros, who had a great pass in this team in 2005. Quinteros including talked with Gianni and was very eager to play for Católica, affirmed the former striker of the UC. He made his official debut for the club as a starter in a 4–1 win over Unión Española, being substituted at 83rd minute.

Honours
Argentinos Juniors
Argentine Primera División (1): Clausura 2010

References

External links
 
 Nicolás Gianni at Football-Lineups
 

1982 births
Living people
Sportspeople from Buenos Aires Province
Argentine footballers
Argentine expatriate footballers
Association football forwards
Argentinos Juniors footballers
Defensores de Belgrano footballers
Club Deportivo Universidad Católica footballers
Estudiantes de Mérida players
Crucero del Norte footballers
AEK Kouklia F.C. players
Chacarita Juniors footballers
Club Atlético Fénix players
Deportivo Coopsol players
Gimnasia y Tiro footballers
Chilean Primera División players
Argentine Primera División players
Cypriot First Division players
Argentine expatriate sportspeople in Chile
Argentine expatriate sportspeople in Ecuador
Argentine expatriate sportspeople in Venezuela
Argentine expatriate sportspeople in Cyprus
Expatriate footballers in Chile
Expatriate footballers in Ecuador
Expatriate footballers in Venezuela
Expatriate footballers in Cyprus